"Chip Chip" is a song written by Jeff Barry, 	Cliff Crofford, and Arthur Resnick and performed by Gene McDaniels.  The song was produced by Snuff Garrett and featured Earl Palmer on drums.

Chart performance
The song reached #10 on the Billboard chart in 1962.  Outside the US, the song reached #2 in Australia.

References

1961 songs
1961 singles
Songs written by Jeff Barry
Gene McDaniels songs
Song recordings produced by Snuff Garrett
Liberty Records singles
Songs written by Artie Resnick